The Royal Institute of Navigation (RIN) is a learned society and a professional body for navigation. The RIN was founded in 1947 as a forum for mariners, pilots, engineers and academics to compare their experiences and exchange information. Today it is a leading centre for promoting knowledge in navigation and its associated sciences, including positioning, timing, tracking and conduct of a journey, whether on, in, over or under land, sea, air or space. The Institute has members in over 50 countries worldwide.

History
The organisation was formed in 1947 as the Institute of Navigation and was patterned after the US Institute of Navigation. Both organisations had been influenced by the role navigation had helped in moving troops and supplies during Second World War.  Emerging technology such as radar and LORAN increased in the years following the war.  The Institute sought to provide a forum where academics, engineers, mariners, and pilots could learn, exchange information, and share personal experiences.

The Institute's founding membership included several notable professionals in the field.  From the field of astronomy Sir Harold Spencer Jones, the Astronomer-Royal was the first president.  The first two vice-presidents represented the field of aviation in Air Chief Marshal Sir John Slessor (Deputy Chief of the Air Staff) and the development of radar in Sir Robert Watson-Watt. Marine navigation was represented by Michael Richey who became the first Executive Secretary from 1947 to 1982. In 1948, Richey would found the Institute's official academic publication, the Journal of Navigation and edit the journal until 1986. Sir Robert Watson-Watt would become the second president of the Institute.

The Institute expanded its focus in the 1950s and 1960s to also address issues of safety and began collaborating with similar organizations in Europe. In 1972, at its 25th anniversary, its work was recognized by Her Majesty the Queen and it became entitled to the "Royal" prefix and was renamed the Royal Institute of Navigation. Some of the Presidents of the Institute during this time included Donald Sadler (the astronomer and mathematician) who was President from 1953 to 1955, Rear Admiral Edmund George Irving who was President from 1964 to 1967 and Rear Admiral George Stephen Ritchie who was President from 1970 to 1972.

More recently, the Institute has broadened its activities to include significant developments in the understanding and applications of cognitive navigation, human factors and animal navigation. The institute also fulfills an important role in the provision of guidance information for practical navigators including private pilots and small boat mariners.

From 2005 to 2008, the President of the Institute was Professor J D Last, a consultant engineer and expert in communications systems who subsequently died at sea in a plane crash in November 2019. Roger McKinlay, an engineer was President from 2013 to 2015 and in 2015 said that increasing dependence on technology means people were losing their ability to find their way by traditional methods, specifically stating society was "sedated by software". In 2015, McKinlay was replaced by Captain J B Taylor OBE, who was elected President until 2018.

From 2018 to 2021, the President of the RIN was Terry Moore, a positioning and navigation expert at the University of Nottingham. While President, Moore focused on expanding awareness of issues relating to positioning, navigation and timing (PNT), in particular stating that "Reliable position and timing are strategically important resources and that having control over them is important in the same way as having secure energy supplies." In 2021, Cynthia Robertson, an RYA Yachtmaster Examiner and Fellow of the Society was elected as the first female President of the Institute.

In 2022, the Institute hosted its Waves of Navigation exhibition in London as part of its commemorations to mark its 75th anniversary. This include a 75th Anniversary Reception at St James’s Palace hosted by the Princess Royal.

Governance 
The Institute is a UK-registered charity with a Royal Charter. The charity registration is 1117254.

The Institute is governed by its board of trustees called the Council, which is chaired by its President. The members of Council and the President are elected from the Institute's membership and serve for up to a three-year term.

The Institute has four specialist committees to advise the Council: the Technical Committee, Audit and Risk Committee, Membership and Fellowship Committee, and the Remuneration Committee.

Membership 
Membership is available to anyone in the world with an interest in navigation or its associated sciences. There are five categories of individual membership:

 The most popular membership is that of Ordinary Member providing full membership benefits and allowing the individual to adopt the post nominal letters MRIN.
 Associate status offers affiliate status with the Institute and does not allow the individual to hold office. 
 There are two categories of membership designed for younger members -  Junior Associate, for those under 18 years of age and Student for those under 25.
 The Institute also offers the possibility to progress to Associate Fellow or Fellow membership for those that have achieved a high level of professional involvement or achievement in navigation or its associated sciences or have made a significant contribution to navigation, respectively.

The Institute also offers a number of plans tailored to corporate bodies including businesses, clubs and universities.

Professional Registration 
Through being a professional affiliate of the UK's Engineering Council (EngC), the Institute offers professional registration to the Engineering Council's registers in the following three categories of professional engineers and technicians:

 Chartered Engineer (CEng)
 Incorporated Engineer (IEng)
 Engineering Technician (EngTech)

Any member of the Institute who can demonstrate professional competence and commitment is able to apply for professional registration through the RIN. It is expected that registered members are committed to maintaining their professional standard through ongoing continuous professional development.

Special Interest Groups 
The Institute hosts a number of Special Interest Groups (SIGs) catering for members' interests in specific areas; all SIGs are organised and run from within the Institute's membership.

The Institute's active SIGs are the Small Craft Group, Cognition and Navigation Group, Animal Navigation Group, General Aviation Navigation Group, History of Navigation Group, Professional Marine Navigation Group, Civil and Military Aviation Group, and the Younger Members' Group.

Activities

The Institute sponsors conferences, publications, and reports related to navigation and its associated sciences. The Institute may publish position papers or white papers in relation to current navigation-related developments.

In  2017 its international conference included contemporary topics as artificial intelligence, cyber threats, and machine learning. It also co-sponsored a report to the UK government on the economic impact of a 5-day loss of geopositioning systems.

In 2019, the Institute launched an online 'Resilient positioning, navigation, and timing (PNT) Portal.

Following a period of internal review, in 2019 the Institute published its vision of becoming an inclusive group of diverse disciplines working together for a more navigable world. A 5-year strategy was published simultaneously with the vision outlining three pillars within which many of the Institute's activities would be focused.

 Learned Society
 Professional Body
 Increasing diversity and inclusivity

Following the COVID-19 pandemic, many of the Institute's activities transitioned to virtual events.

In November 2021, the Institute held its 2021 Conference in Edinburgh at the Edinburgh International Conference Centre in a hybrid physical and virtual format. HRH The Princess Royal (Princess Anne) attended via Zoom.

In November 2022, the Institute held a Leadership Seminar on PNT.

Awards and Scholarships 

The Institute presents a number of awards to individuals and organisations that have contributed to the advancement of navigation and its associated sciences:

 The Harold Spencer-Jones Gold Medal is the Institute's highest award and is awarded in recognition to those making an outstanding contribution to navigation. Examples of past recipients include P. V. H. Weems, Sir Francis Chichester and Sir Robin Knox-Johnston.
 The JED Williams Medal is awarded to individuals making an outstanding contribution to the affairs of the Institute.
 The Michael Richey Medal is awarded to the authors of the best paper in each volume of the Institute's Journal of Navigation.
 The Duke of Edinburgh's Navigation Award (formerly the Institute's Technical Excellence Award) is awarded to individuals or organisations for outstanding technical achievement. Examples of past recipients include the National Air Traffic Services and NASA.

Nomination guidance for the various awards is provided on the Institute's website.

The Institute offers a number of scholarships to assist in the education and development of its younger members.

Library 
The Institute houses the Cundall Library of Navigation at its offices in London. The Cundall Library of Navigation, the UK's leading navigation-specific library of books and resources, from which members may borrow, is also open to the public.

Publications 
The Institute regularly issues two leading publications in print edition as well as online:

 The Journal of Navigation is published six times a year by Cambridge University Press and available at here. It contains papers which have been presented at meetings, other original papers and selected papers and reports from the Institute's Special Interest Groups.
 Navigation News is published six times a year by the Institute and contains a full accounts of the Institute's proceedings and activities, including a record of current navigational work, a diary of events, topical articles, news, membership, and advertising.

References

External links
 Royal Institute of Navigation
International Association of Institutes of Navigation

Navigation
Learned societies of the United Kingdom
1947 establishments in the United Kingdom
Organizations established in 1947
Navigation organizations
Geographic data and information organisations in the United Kingdom